Sandra Toft Galsgaard (born 18 October 1989) is a Danish handball goalkeeper for Győri ETO KC  and the Danish national team.

She made her debut on the Danish national team on 27 March 2008, against Czech Republic.

She participated for the first time at the 2011 World Women's Handball Championship in Brazil.

Individual awards
 IHF World Player of the Year - Women: 2021
 All-Star Goalkeeper of the World Championship: 2021
 All-Star Goalkeeper of the European Championship: 2016, 2020
 All-Star Team Best Goalkeeper of the EHF Champions League: 2015
 Handball-Planet.com All-Star Goalkeeper of the Year: 2019

Personal
In 2009, Sandra was driving back home from North Zealand when she lost control over her vehicle. At 10 pm, north of the city Give, the car spun off the road, flew 50 metres across a field and made four rollovers. Sandra survived the car crash, but suffered a severe neck vertebra collapse. Only five months later she was back on court for Team Tvis Holstebro.

References

External links

Player info at Team Tvis Holstebro 
National game stats at Danish Handball Federation (search for Sandra Toft)

Danish female handball players
1989 births
Living people
Expatriate handball players
Danish expatriate sportspeople in France
Danish expatriate sportspeople in Norway
Danish expatriate sportspeople in Hungary
People from Gribskov Municipality
TTH Holstebro players
Sportspeople from the Capital Region of Denmark

Győri Audi ETO KC players